Kawai Point is a jutting headland on the south-east coast of the island of Kauai in the Hawaiian Islands.

External links

Headlands of Kauai